Sunil Yamanappa Vallyapur is an Indian politician and a member of Karnataka Legislative Council from Bharatiya Janata Party.

Early life and education
Vallyapur was born to Yamanappa and hails from Chandapur, Chincholi, Karnataka. He completed pre-university education from Sri Siddeshwar Junior College, Bijapur in 1983.

Positions held 
State unit Secretary of the Scheduled Castes Morcha of the BJP 2003 
Member of the Legislative Assembly from Shahabad  2004
Member of the Legislative Assembly from Chincholi  2008 
Minister of Infrastructure Development for Government of Karnataka 2012
Member of Legislative Council from Karnataka 2020

MLA election defeat
Member of the Legislative Assembly election 2013 from Chincholi
Member of the Legislative Assembly election 2018 from Chincholi

References

1960s births
Living people
People from  Kalaburagi district
Bharatiya Janata Party politicians from Karnataka
Karnataka MLAs 2004–2007
Karnataka MLAs 2008–2013
Members of the Karnataka Legislative Council